Past Perfect Future Tense is the first solo album of Norwegian band a-ha's Magne Furuholmen as Magne F. Coldplay members, Will Champion and Guy Berryman  collaborated on this project as well as Travis member, Andy Dunlop.

The album was recorded at Kensaltown Recording Studios in London. To launch the record Magne Furuholmen set up a website featuring hidden links to be found among the album lyrics. The album was launched in conjunction with "Payne’s Gray", a portfolio consisting of 12 prints featuring extracts of the album lyrics, followed by a coffee table art book ("Payne's Gray", 2004,Hatje Cantz Publishers).

Furuholmen told Norwegian newspaper VG: "It all started out as an ordinary songwriting process in the wake of the last a-ha album, but all the way I’ve had this feeling that it was turning into a solo project."

Track listing 

The song "Never Sweeter" ends at minute 2:56. After 5 minutes of silence (2:56 – 7:56), begins the hidden track "Perfect Circle".

References

External links 
 

2004 albums
Magne Furuholmen albums